Anna Daly (born 10 March 1977) is an Irish television presenter. She worked for TV3 and was a presenter on TV3's breakfast show, Ireland AM and Weekend AM.

Daly was born in Dublin and graduated with an International Marketing degree from the Marketing Institute of Ireland. She spent four years working in sponsorship and marketing for TV3, eventually becoming the station's Marketing Manager.

She married Ben Ward in Portugal in September 2008. They have three sons.

In 2008, Daly was nominated for Image Magazine'''s Young Business Woman of the Year. She has also won at the TV Now Awards.

In 2021 Daly moved from Virgin Media Television to the national broadcaster RTÉ, presenting Hospital Live and Future Island'' magazine shows.

References

External links
 
 

1977 births
Living people
Ireland AM hosts
RTÉ television presenters
Weather presenters
Television personalities from Dublin (city)
Irish female models
Models from Dublin (city)